U.S. Route 93 (US 93) is a major north–south numbered highway running from US 60 in Wickenburg, Arizona to the Canadian border north of Eureka, Montana, where the roadway continues into Roosville, British Columbia as Highway 93. It passes through Kingman, Arizona; Las Vegas, Nevada; Twin Falls, Idaho; and Missoula, Montana.

Route description

|-
|AZ
|
|-
|NV
|
|-
|ID
|
|-
|MT
|
|-
|Total
|
|}

Arizona

Thirty miles northwest of Wickenburg, US 93 passes through a large forest of Joshua trees and is thus labeled the Joshua Forest Parkway of Arizona until it reaches Wikieup.

From there, it heads north, eventually merging with I-40 to head west to Kingman. US 93 then splits from I-40 in Kingman and heads north to the Hoover Dam. Chloride is located off this highway, and Santa Claus is on the western side, about  before the Chloride Road intersection.

This highway was known to be one of the deadliest routes in America until recently. The years of improvements have made it a much safer road to travel, according to the Federal Highway Administration.

Nevada

US 93 enters Nevada where Interstate 11 begins: on the Hoover Dam Bypass. US 93 then winds its way west-southwest through Boulder City before merging with US 95 past the interchange with State Route 173. They then curve northwest toward Las Vegas. These combined routes then join and run concurrent with the Interstate 11 and Interstate 515 freeways through Henderson and southeastern Las Vegas, where US 93 exits at the Las Vegas Spaghetti Bowl interchange just northwest of downtown, heading northbound concurrently with Interstate 15. Those two routes then run in a northeasterly direction through North Las Vegas until they exit the metro area, where US 93 diverges from I-15 at Apex to head north toward Great Basin National Park. Near there, the highway joins with the combined US Routes 6 and 50 to run northwest toward Ely. In Ely, US 6 first departs and heads west toward Tonopah. Then, shortly thereafter, US 50 departs US 93 to continue west toward Fallon and Reno (via US 50 Alt west, US 95 Alt north, and I-80 west) and Carson City. Upon reaching Lages Station, US 93 Alt splits off in a northeasterly direction toward 
West Wendover. The main route of US 93 continues north from Lages Station, intersecting Interstate 80 at Wells before crossing the Idaho state line near Jackpot.

Between State Route 318 and Majors Junction (US 6 and 50), US 93 is designated a Nevada Scenic Byway.

From Ely to Schellbourne Ranch, US 93 is part of the Lincoln Highway, the first road across the United States.

Idaho

Shortly after entering Idaho at Jackpot, Nevada, US 93 passes US 30 as it enters Twin Falls. North of here, the highway crosses the Snake River Canyon via the Perrine Bridge en route to an interchange with Interstate 84. US 93 passes through Shoshone and runs concurrently with US Routes 26 and 20 before reaching Arco. The highway then turns northwest to enter the Big Lost River valley through Mackay.

Just south of Challis, US 93 becomes the northern leg of the Salmon River Scenic Byway as it heads toward the town of Salmon. From there, the highway follows portions of the Lewis and Clark Trail and passes through the Salmon-Challis National Forest before entering Montana.

Montana

US 93 enters Montana from Idaho at Lost Trail Pass and travels north descending through the Bitterroot National Forest. The highway continues along the Lewis and Clark Trail into the Bitterroot Valley towards Missoula, passing through Darby and Hamilton.

From Wye, US 93 continues north through the Flathead Indian Reservation, where its signage includes the historic Salish and Kutenai names for towns, rivers, and streams. Portions of this section run along the Bison Range. North of the reservation, US 93 traverses the western shore of Flathead Lake, the largest freshwater lake west of the Mississippi River. North of the lake the highway runs through the cities of Kalispell and Whitefish, traveling through the Flathead National Forest and the Stillwater State Forest before reaching its terminus at the Canada–US border near Eureka.

The portion north of Hamilton travels through one of the most densely populated areas in Montana. This section also serves as a popular north–south connection between Yellowstone National Park and Glacier National Park. As a result, the road tends to become more congested between Hamilton and Whitefish. A popular bumper sticker in Montana reads, "Pray for me, I drive Hwy 93!"

History

U.S. Route 93 was not one of the original U.S. highways proposed in the 1925 Bureau of Public Roads plan. However, the revised numbering plan approved by the American Association of State Highway Officials (AASHO) on November 11, 1926, established US 93 from the Canada–US border near Eureka, Montana, south through Montana and Idaho to a southern terminus at Wells, Nevada.

US 93's original northern terminus was a few miles west of its current terminus, along the Kootenai River at the Gateway Port of entry. This was the case until around 1934, when US 93 was routed along its current route.

AASHO, at its June 8, 1931, meeting, approved a southerly extension of US 93 south to Glendale, Nevada. By 1932, the Nevada Department of Highways had marked the continuation of the highway using the routing of several preexisting state highways.

At the request of the Arizona State Highway Department, the AASHO route numbering committee approved another extension of US 93 in 1935. This shifted the southern terminus south to Kingman, Arizona, by way of Las Vegas. Nevada officials again extended the route along preexisting highways; however, they may not have signed the extension right away as it was not shown on Nevada's state-published maps until 1939.

Until 1993, US 93 ended a short distance north of Wickenburg, Arizona, at a junction with U.S. Route 89. When US 89 was decommissioned in the area, the US 93 designation was carried on into Wickenburg.

A highway segment opened on October 19, 2010, in the area of Hoover Dam; the Hoover Dam Bypass replaces a segment of US 93 over the dam that had been closed to truck traffic due to security concerns since the September 11, 2001, attacks. The bypass crosses the Colorado River on a bridge downstream of the dam. The bypass eliminated the permanent truck detour through either Laughlin, Nevada, or Needles, California, that had been in place since 2001.

Future
US 93 (with US 60 to the southeast of Wickenburg) is currently the shortest and most direct route between Las Vegas and Phoenix, two of the fastest-growing cities in the United States. Upgrades of US 60 and US 93 to expressway status are scheduled between Las Vegas and Phoenix. Most recently, in the 2012 Fixing America's Surface Transportation Act, the United States Congress officially designated a new Interstate freeway corridor between the two cities as I-11, which would mostly or completely replace US 93 in Arizona.

A new US 93 Alt. was built to bypass through traffic around downtown Kalispell, Montana, from 2010 to 2016. Currently, US 93 through Kalispell is Main Street and Sunset Boulevard, a  arterial. The remaining  opened October 28, 2016. The southwest  segment of the bypass is currently only two lanes, and is slated for expansion to four lanes with two additional grade-separated interchanges when funding permits.

Major intersections
Arizona
  in Wickenburg
  east-northeast of Kingman. I-40 and US 93 travel concurrently to Kingman. I-11/US 93 are proposed to travel concurrently to Phoenix.
  in Kingman. I-11/US 93 are proposed to travel concurrently to Las Vegas, Nevada.
Nevada
  from Boulder City to Las Vegas. The highways travel concurrently to Las Vegas. I-11/US 95 are proposed to travel concurrently to Tonopah and Reno.
  in Henderson
  from Las Vegas to North Las Vegas. I-15/US 93 travels concurrently to northeast of North Las Vegas.
  in Majors Place. The highways travel concurrently to Ely.
  in Wells
Idaho
  east of Filer. The highways travel concurrently to Twin Falls.
  north of Twin Falls
  in Shoshone. The highways travel concurrently to Arco.
  in Carey. The highways travel concurrently to Arco.
Montana
  in Lolo. The highways travel concurrently to Missoula.
  in Missoula. The highways travel concurrently to Wye.
  in Kalispell
  at the Canada–United States border north of Eureka

Special routes

Boulder City business

U.S. Route 93 Business (US 93 Bus.) is a business route of US 93 in Clark County, Nevada. The route provides access to Lake Mead and downtown Boulder City from Interstate 11 (I-11). The route was originally part of mainline US 93 before it was realigned around Boulder City along I-11.

Lages Junction–Wells alternate

U.S. Route 93 Alternate is an alternate route of US 93 in northeastern Nevada. The southern terminus is at Lages Station in northern White Pine County, where it separates from US 93. The route continues north to West Wendover where it joins Interstate 80. US 93 ALT follows I-80 west to Wells, where it terminates at an interchange with US 93.

US 93 ALT provides a shortcut from central Nevada to Salt Lake City, Utah via eastbound Interstate 80.

Kalispell alternate

U.S. Route 93 Alternate in the U.S. state of Montana is an alternate route of US 93 that bypasses the central business district of the city of Kalispell.

Shoshone–Challis alternate

Between 1926 and 1977 a road between Shoshone, Idaho, and Challis, Idaho, was also labeled US 93 Alternate. This stretch of road is now designated as part of US 93. The pre-1977 routing of US 93 between those points is now designated as State Highway 75.

Cultural references
Highway 93 features in the title track from Montana Cafe, a studio album by American country music artist Hank Williams Jr., released by Warner Bros. Records in July 1986.

U.S. 93 is referenced in the song "Killer Road" by Iowa blues band The Unidynes from their 1996 album Once in a Blue Room.

Metal band Avenged Sevenfold included the stretch of U.S. Highway 93 between Kingman and Wickenburg, in Arizona, in the music video for their song, "Dear God". Many clips of the highway, and landmarks along the stretch of highway, are portrayed from the band's tour bus in the video.

References

Further reading

External links

 FHWA - U.S. 93 Reaching For The Border
 Endpoints of U.S. Highway 93
 Boulder City / US 93 Bypass

 
93